Maharishi Markandeshwar University, Sadopur (MMU Sadopur) is a private university at Sadopur, Ambala district, near the city of Ambala, in the state of Haryana, India. It was established by the Maharishi Markandeshwar University under the provisions of the Haryana Private Universities Act, 2006, and legislated under Haryana Govt. Act No. 29 of 2010.

Academics
The university offers various undergraduate and postgraduate programmes of study.

Accreditation
Like all universities in India, the university is recognized by the University Grants Commission (UGC). It is also approved by the All India Council for Technical Education (AICTE) and the Council of Architecture (COA).

Campus
In the campus there is an Punjab National Bank branch, a Bharat Petroleum petrol outlet and an auditorium with seating capacity of about 200 and 250 persons respectively.

References

External links 
 

Private universities in India
Universities in Haryana
Ambala district
Educational institutions established in 2010
2010 establishments in Haryana